The Garden of Allah was a mid-20th century gay cabaret that opened in 1946 in the basement of the Victorian-era Arlington Hotel in Seattle's Pioneer Square. It was Seattle's most popular gay cabaret in the late 1940s and 1950s and one of the first gay-owned gay bars in the United States. Prior to becoming a cabaret, the space had been a speakeasy, during Prohibition, and then a tavern.

The Garden catered to all factions of the LGBT community, though heterosexual patrons, tourists and military personnel on leave also visited. Acts were primarily female impersonation, though some male impersonators also performed; the former sometimes included striptease. One act was the professional female-impersonation Jewel Box Revue, though that act was largely geared to and supported by hetero people.

Patrons report that the cabaret became like a "family" or "support group", and Don Paulson, author of An Evening at the Garden of Allah: A Gay Cabaret in Seattle, noted that he believes the sense of community and group consciousness produced by the Garden was what made the gay rights movement of later decades possible.

The Garden closed in 1956, when a combination of a rate raise from the musicians' union and a raise in city taxes on locales that provided both entertainment and alcohol put it out of business.

References

External links
Queer History in Seattle, Part 1: to 1967, Historylink.org
A few photos and a small amount of other information, on the site of the Puget Sound Theatre Organ Society.
Photograph of the Arlington Hotel, c. 1900, from the University of Washington collections
Photograph of the Arlington Hotel, c. 1913, from the University of Washington collections

1946 establishments in Washington (state)
1956 disestablishments in Washington (state)
Cabaret
History of Seattle
LGBT culture in Seattle